Operation Edelweiss is a 1954 West German war film directed by Heinz Paul and starring Joachim Mock, Albert Hehn and Wolf Petersen. It was shot at the Göttingen Studios and on location in Switzerland. The film's sets were designed by the art directors Hans Kuhnert and Theo Zwierski.

Cast
 Joachim Mock as Friederich
 Albert Hehn as Stefan Hallweger
 Wolf Petersen as Adelbert
 Walter Ladengast as Ignatz
 Jochen Blume as Paul Hübner
 Werner Werndorff as Werner Lobisser
 Gustl Gstettenbaur as Hardei
 Reinhard Kolldehoff as Erich
 Franz Muxeneder as Melchior
 Sepp Rist as Magnus Rasmussen
 Alice Graf as Silke Rasmussen
 Rolf von Nauckhoff as Eike Rasmussen
 Otto Reinwald

References

Bibliography 
 Goble, Alan. The Complete Index to Literary Sources in Film. Walter de Gruyter, 1999.*

External links 
 

1954 films
West German films
German war films
1954 war films
1950s German-language films
Films directed by Heinz Paul
German World War II films
Films set in Norway
Films shot in Switzerland
Films shot at Göttingen Studios
Mountaineering films
German black-and-white films
1950s German films